Ocotea clarkei is a species of Ocotea in the plant family Lauraceae. It is an evergreen tree that is endemic to the Mexican state of Chiapas.

References

clarkei
Endemic flora of Mexico
Flora of Chiapas
Trees of Chiapas
Conservation dependent plants
Near threatened biota of Mexico
Taxonomy articles created by Polbot